Wu Tsai-fu (born 22 May 1971) is a Taiwanese weightlifter. He competed in the men's light heavyweight event at the 1996 Summer Olympics.

References

1971 births
Living people
Taiwanese male weightlifters
Olympic weightlifters of Taiwan
Weightlifters at the 1996 Summer Olympics
Place of birth missing (living people)
Weightlifters at the 1994 Asian Games
Asian Games competitors for Chinese Taipei
20th-century Taiwanese people